These are the official results of the women's 4 × 100 metres relay event at the 1968 Summer Olympics in Mexico City, Mexico. The event was held on the 19th and 20 October 1968.  There were a total number of 15 nations competing.

Results

Final
Held on 20 October 1968

Semifinals
Held on 19 October 1968

Heat 1

Heat 2

References

External links
 Official Report

R
Relay foot races at the Olympics
1968 in women's athletics
Women's events at the 1968 Summer Olympics